Sven Alf Nilsson (18 May 1930 – 19 December 2018) was a Swedish actor and artist.

Early life and education 

Nilsson grew up in Boden, where he had roles in local revues from an early age. He went through the drama school connected to the Gothenburg City Theatre in 1952 – 1954.

Career
Throughout Nilsson's career as an actor, he primarily worked at the Gothenburg City Theatre, but also other theatres around the country including the Uppsala City Theatre and the Helsingborg City Theatre.

He made his film debut in Blånande hav (1956). While he was not a prolific film actor, he appeared in feature films such as The Hunters from 1996 and Dalecarlians from 2004, where he had minor roles that received positive acclaim.

As a television actor, he appeared in the long-running TV series Hem till byn, where he played the role of Harald Eriksson from 1973 to 2006. He played the police inspector Bo Kronborg, one of the main roles in the comedy-drama television series Polisen i Strömstad throughout the run of the series. 

As an artist, he exhibited together with his brother Rolf and Eric Ståhl.

Personal life
Nilsson had three children together with actor Ann-Christine Gry, who played Elsie Eriksson, wife of Alf Nilsson's character Harald, in Hem till Byn. Their eldest son Johan Gry is an actor, who works at the Gothenburg City Theatre.

Filmography

Film

References 

1930 births
2018 deaths
20th-century Swedish male actors
21st-century Swedish male actors
Swedish male film actors
Swedish male stage actors
Swedish male television actors
People from Boden Municipality